Good Shepherd Convent, Kandy, is a semi-government fee-levying Roman Catholic girls' school in Kandy, Sri Lanka. The convent was established by Sister Mary of St. Magdalence de Pazzi Walsh and Sister Mary of St. Constance in February 1889.

Principals

References 

Educational institutions established in 1889
1889 establishments in Ceylon
Girls' schools in Sri Lanka
Schools in Kandy